Since Tunisia's first international association football match on 2 June 1957 against Libya, there have been 12 occasions when a Tunisian player has scored three or more goals (a hat-trick) in a game. The first hat-trick was scored by Moncef Chérif against Chinese Taipei on 18 August 1960.

List

References

External links 

 Tunisia national football team statistics and records: hat tricks

Hat-tricks
Tunisia
Tunisia